Su Di (born 17 July 1990) is a Chinese footballer currently playing as a left-back or left winger for Dalian Duxing.

Club career
Su Di began his professional football career with Shenyang Zhongze in the 2011 China League One season. In three seasons with them, he would play 27 times for the club and contributed one goal. On 27 February 2014, he joined third tier club Dalian Transcendence and would be a vital part of the team that gained promotion to the second tier after the club came runners-up to Meizhou Kejia at the end of the 2015 China League Two campaign. After establishing Dalian Transcendence within the division and helping them avoid relegation the following season, he would attract the interests of second tier promotion chasing Wuhan Zall, who he joined on 20 January 2017.  

Su would make his debut for Wuhan Zall in a league game on 16 March 2017 against Meizhou Hakka in a 2-1 defeat. Throughout the season he would struggle to establish himself within the team and was allowed to join fourth tier club Wuhan Three Towns, where he would aid them to promotion to the third tier at the end of the 2018 Chinese Champions League. He would go on to aid them to win the division title and promotion into the second tier at the end of the 2020 China League Two campaign. This would be followed by another division title win and promotion as the club entered the top tier for the first tine in their history.

Career statistics
.

Notes

Honours

Club
Wuhan Three Towns
China League One: 2021.
China League Two: 2020.

References

External links

1990 births
Living people
Footballers from Shenyang
Footballers from Liaoning
Chinese footballers
Association football defenders
China League Two players
China League One players
Shenyang Zhongze F.C. players
Dalian Transcendence F.C. players
Wuhan F.C. players
Wuhan Three Towns F.C. players